Yane Márcia Campos da Fonseca Marques (born January 7, 1984 in Afogados da Ingazeira) is a modern pentathlon athlete from Brazil. She became nationally known despite the obscurity of her sport in the country after winning a bronze medal at the 2012 Summer Olympics, the first Latin American to medal and the only woman to do so.

Biography
Hailing from the Sertão of the Brazilian state of Pernambuco, Marques moved to the state capital Recife at the age of 11 so her older siblings could attend college. One year later, she became a swimmer for Clube Náutico Capibaribe, where she competed alongside future Olympian Joanna Maranhão. Marques change of sport occurred in 2003, when she was invited to a biathle competition held by Pernambuco's recently inaugurated modern pentathlon federation, part of the then-new Brazilian confederation's plan to spread the sport. Marques won, and was invited by confederation founder Alexandre França to become a pentathlete. Just one year after changing to modern pentathlon, with França as part of her coaching staff, Marques was Brazilian and South American champion.

The gold medal in the 2007 Pan American Games, held in Rio de Janeiro, qualified Marques for her Olympian debut at the 2008 Summer Olympics, where she finished 18th overall. The following year, Marques joined the Brazilian Army to gain the scholarship and training facilities reserved for military sportspeople. Marques wound up topping the Brazilian pentathlon rankings in 2010, and became 3rd in the world in 2011, where she was a silver medalist at the Pan American Games and three medals at the Military World Games.

Arriving at the 2012 Summer Olympics with medal expectations, Marques started with a 6th place in fencing, jumped to second following swimming and kept the position following the show jumping. The combined running/shooting closer had Marques win the bronze, Brazil's final medal in those Olympics. Following the Games, Marques rose to 2nd in the world rankings, preceded only by gold medallist Laura Asadauskaitė of Lithuania.

Marques was chosen through popular vote to be the flagbearer of Brazil for the opening ceremony of the 2016 Summer Olympics, which the country would host in Rio de Janeiro. She was only the second woman to hold the honor following Sandra Pires. With bad results in the fencing, Yane finished at 23rd in the modern pentathlon. Despite that, she expressed no regrets in the results, particularly as Marques' pentathlon performances helped spread her sport.

Marques holds a degree at physical education at Recife's UNINASSAU. She is married to a fellow pentathlete, Aloísio Sandes.

References

 2011 Military Games results (archived)
 2015 Military Games results

1984 births
Living people
Brazilian female modern pentathletes
Olympic modern pentathletes of Brazil
Olympic bronze medalists for Brazil
Modern pentathletes at the 2007 Pan American Games
Modern pentathletes at the 2008 Summer Olympics
Modern pentathletes at the 2011 Pan American Games
Modern pentathletes at the 2012 Summer Olympics
Olympic medalists in modern pentathlon
Medalists at the 2012 Summer Olympics
World Modern Pentathlon Championships medalists
Pan American Games gold medalists for Brazil
Pan American Games silver medalists for Brazil
Pan American Games medalists in modern pentathlon
Modern pentathletes at the 2015 Pan American Games
Modern pentathletes at the 2016 Summer Olympics
South American Games gold medalists for Brazil
South American Games medalists in modern pentathlon
Competitors at the 2014 South American Games
Medalists at the 2011 Pan American Games
Medalists at the 2015 Pan American Games
Sportspeople from Pernambuco